Amirabad (also Romanized as Amīrābād) is a village in Soltaniyeh Rural District, Soltaniyeh District, Abhar County, Zanjan Province, Iran. During the 2006 census, its existence was noted, however, its population was not reported.

References 

Populated places in Abhar County